The 1882 Penn Quakers football team represented the University of Pennsylvania in the 1882 college football season. They finished with a 2–4 record.

Schedule

References

Penn
Penn Quakers football seasons
Penn Quakers football